Jacqueline Kay Swinburne (née Jones) (born 8 June 1967) is a Welsh Conservative politician who was a Member of the European Parliament (MEP) for Wales between 2009 and 2019.

Background
Born and raised in West Wales and a fluent Welsh-speaker, Swinburne was educated at Llandysul Grammar School and went on to earn a degree in Biochemistry and Microbiology and a PhD in medical research from King's College London, and an MBA from the University of Surrey, before starting a career in international healthcare and investment banking. Swinburne first came to national attention in 1999 when she resigned from Deutsche Bank after being a victim of sexual discrimination.

Early Political career
She spent six years (29 May 2003 – 24 March 2009 as a Town Councillor for Ledbury Parish Council and was elected mayor in 2006.

Later in 2006, she also stood to be a Conservative Councillor on Herefordshire County Council and was duly appointed, serving as Chair of the Health Scrutiny committee. During this time she also served as Deputy Chair of the North Herefordshire Conservatives Association (NHCA). She stepped down as a County Councillor in March 2010.

On 28 March 2008 it was announced that she was to head the Welsh Conservatives' list of candidates for the 2009 European Parliament election, effectively guaranteeing her a seat in the European Parliament. Her election in June 2009 was notable for being the first time the Conservative Party topped an election in Wales since 1918.

Wales
She is a member of the Welsh Conservatives and the Welsh Conservatives Party Board.

She was reselected by the Welsh Conservative Party as its lead candidate for the European election in 2014, following a meeting of the Welsh Regional Selection College in May 2013.

European Parliament

In the European Parliament, Swinburne sits in the European Conservatives and Reformists (ECR Group), a Conservative Party led group created in 2009 to campaign for urgent reform of the European Union. She is Vice Chairman of the Committee on Economic and Monetary Affairs, and a member of the European Parliament's delegation to the United States of America. She was formerly a substitute for the EuroMed Parliamentary Assembly (DMED): the Union for the Mediterranean which promotes economic integration and democratic reform across 16 neighbours to the EU's south in North Africa and the Middle East and the European Parliament Delegation to Palestine. She also was the ECR Group's Co-ordinator on the Special Committee on the Financial, Economic and Social Crisis (CRIS). Her extensive meetings with lobbyists for the financial industry have been criticised.

European Parliament Committees
As Vice Chairman: 
 Committee on Economic and Monetary Affairs (ECON) [9 March 2017 – present]

As Member: 
 Committee on Economic and Monetary Affairs (ECON) [16 September 2009 – present]
 Special Committee on the Financial, Economic and Social Crisis [08.10.2009 – 31 July 2011]

As Substitute:
 Committee on the Environment, Public Health and Food Safety [1 July 2014 – present]
Committee on Culture and Education (CULT) [25 January 2012 – 1 July 2014]
 Committee on Foreign Affairs (AFET) [07.09.2009 – 23 June 2010]

During her first term as MEP for Wales, she was the Rapporteur on three reports for the ECON committee:
 REPORT on regulation of trading in financial instruments – dark pools etc. [16 November 2010]
– Examined the period of unprecedented change European capital markets have undergone, both due to a changed regulatory environment, post MiFID implementation, and due to the technological advancements over the same period.
– All set in the context of the period of financial crisis, which the report followed.
 REPORT on the proposal for a regulation of the European Parliament and of the Council on improving securities settlement in the European Union and on central securities depositories (CSDs) and amending Directive 98/26/EC [14 February 2013]
– Following the 2008–09 crisis, financial regulators and policy makers have widened their interest in the post trade environment to ensuring that our financial infrastructure mitigates counterparty risk where possible; is resilient; and serves the needs of the end investor.
– This report closely examined the current post-trade settlement systems to assess where improvements can be made to best serve the needs of all investors. Further objectives of this legislation include the encouragement of new entrants so as to foster a competitive environment, a reduction of cross-border settlement costs and the mitigation of counterparty risk which are all addressed in the report.
 REPORT on Recovery and resolution framework for non-bank institutions [18 June 2013]
– The report focused specifically on Central Counterparts (CCPs) and Central Security Depositories (CSDs) as key critical market infrastructure that needs strong recovery and resolution tools, such as living wills, as a priority.

In addition she also acted as Shadow Rapporteur on a number of reports including the Markets in Financial Instruments Directive and Regulation (MiFID II) report, the legislation implementing G20 criteria for clearing, reporting and trading of derivatives, the establishment of the Euro European Supervisory Authorities including the ESRB, legislation on economic governance and the establishment of a single banking supervisor for the Eurozone.

European Parliament Delegations
Member
Delegation for relations with the United States [1 January 2017 – present]

As Substitute: 
Delegation for relations with the Palestinian Legislative Council (DPLC) [16 September 2009 – 18 October 2009]
Delegation to the Parliamentary Assembly of the Union for the Mediterranean (DMED) [16 September 2009 – 27 March 2012]
Delegation for relations with Switzerland and Norway and to the EU-Iceland Joint Parliamentary Committee and the European Economic Area (EEA) Joint Parliamentary Committee (DEEA) [16 September 2009 – 1 January 2017]

Political Achievements

As coordinator for the ECR group and UK spokesman on Economic and Monetary Affairs, she has successfully negotiated a number of dossiers concerning the UK's key priority on Europe of Financial Services as well as being part of the global reform agenda since the start of the financial crisis. These include EMIR and MiFID which focus on fulfilling the UK's G20 commitment to reform of the derivatives markets. She was also the committee's Rapporteur on a dossier concerning post trade settlement process; this was the first time in 12 years that a UK Conservative has been nominated by the committee to take a leading role on a financial services file.

During the political negotiations within the Parliament concerning the newly proposed Banking Union, she was the only non-Euro zone member of the committee present and successfully gained all political groups support for a requirement for all of the detailed rules involved in financial services to have a double majority of both Euro zone and non-Euro zone members in favour before it could pass into law. A key achievement in protecting the UK's place within the single market, and the way in which decisions will be taken going forwards as parts of the EU become more integrated than others.

A key political achievement was also successfully securing a legislative requirement for a Legal Entity Identifier for Financial Transactions which is now being processed in a facility in North Wales, thereby linking her work on financial services back to her constituency.

She has also prioritised working with the other 4 Welsh MEPs where possible, in particular concerning the use of electronic identification tags for sheep, where the Commission for the first time received a letter from all of the MEPs of one region collectively. As a result of this and a more concerted campaign by others, she has secured a more proportionate approach that recognises the difficulties that Welsh farmers may have otherwise experienced.

Since the Brexit referendum, Kay Swinburne has been appointed Vice Chairman of the Economic and Monetary Affairs committee in the European Parliament.

Campaigns

 'Save the Bee': Launched at the Royal Welsh Show, Summer 2011, to increase public awareness of the plight of bee populations in the UK, and Wales in particular. Rates of decline have reached up to 39% in the last five years.
'Tell us your red-tape problems': Swinburne called on entrepreneurs and leaders of small and medium-sized enterprises (SMEs) in Wales to contact her with their chief concerns over burdensome rules and regulations – particularly those emanating from Brussels. A campaign designed to raise awareness but also to deal with legislative problems encountered by small businesses in their day-to-day running. The move followed an initiative by the European Commissioner for Industry and Entrepreneurship, Antonio Tajani, saying he wanted to discover the 10 most-restrictive pieces of legislation for SMEs on the EU's statute books.

References

External links
Official website
European Parliament profile
Twitter profile
Conservative Party profile
Welsh Conservatives website
Conservatives in the European Parliament website

1968 births
Living people
People educated at Llandysul Grammar School
Alumni of King's College London
Alumni of the University of Surrey
Welsh Conservative MEPs
People from Aberystwyth
MEPs for Wales 2009–2014
MEPs for Wales 2014–2019
21st-century women MEPs for Wales